Cooperative Farm 1 ( – Mazra‘eh-ye Tʿāvanī Ānqolāb Shomāreh-ye Yek) is a village and cooperative farm in Howmeh Rural District, in the Central District of Semnan County, Semnan Province, Iran. At the 2006 census, its population was 28, in 6 families.

References 

Populated places in Semnan County